Art Bitch may refer to:

 "Art Bitch", a 2005 song by CSS from their album Cansei de Ser Sexy
 "Art Bitch", a 2008 song by Charli XCX